Bogusław Litwiniec (1 November 1931 – 25 December 2022) was a Polish theatre director and politician. A member of the Democratic Left Alliance, he served in the Senate of Poland from 2001 to 2005 and in the European Parliament from May to July 2004.

Litwiniec died in Wrocław on 25 December 2022, at the age of 91.

References

1931 births
2022 deaths
Polish theatre directors
Members of the Senate of Poland 2001–2005
MEPs for Poland 2004
Democratic Left Alliance politicians
Polish Socialist Party politicians
Knights of the Order of Polonia Restituta
University of Warsaw alumni
Academic staff of the University of Wrocław
People from Wołyń Voivodeship (1921–1939)